John Henry Oliver is an American former Negro league outfielder who played in the 1940s.

Oliver made his Negro leagues debut in 1944 with the Atlanta Black Crackers. The following season, he played for the Birmingham Black Barons and Memphis Red Sox.

References

External links
 and Baseball-Reference Black Baseball stats and Seamheads

Year of birth missing
Place of birth missing
Atlanta Black Crackers players
Birmingham Black Barons players
Memphis Red Sox players
Baseball outfielders